The Huilliche, Huiliche or Huilliche-Mapuche are the southern partiality of the Mapuche macroethnic group in Chile and Argentina. Located in the Zona Sur, they inhabit both Futahuillimapu ("great land of the south") and, as the Cunco or Veliche subgroup, the north half of Chiloé Island. The Huilliche are the principal indigenous people of those regions. According to Ricardo E. Latcham the term Huilliche started to be used in Spanish after the second founding of Valdivia in 1645, adopting the usage of the Mapuches of Araucanía for the southern Mapuche tribes. Huilliche means 'southerners' (Mapudungun willi 'south' and che 'people'.) A genetic study showed significant affinities between Huilliches and indigenous peoples east of the Andes, which suggests but does not prove a partial origin in present-day Argentina.

During the 16th, 17th, and 18th centuries, the mainland Huilliche were generally successful at resisting Spanish encroachment. However, after the Figueroa incursions of 1792 Huilliches were decisively defeated and their territory was gradually opened to European settlement beginning with the Parliament of Las Canoas. Today, most Huilliche speak Spanish, but some, especially older adults, speak the Huilliche language. Laurelia sempervirens, known in Huilliche triwe and in Spanish as laurel, is the ritual tree of the Huilliche of Futahuillimapu.

Colonization

16th century
In the 1540s Spanish conquereros led by Pedro de Valdivia arrived in Central Chile from newly conquered Peru. Between 1549 and 1553 the Spanish founded several cities in Mapuche territory and one in Huilliche territory: Valdivia. Albeit the death of Pedro de Valdivia in 1553 halted the Spanish conquests for a while Osorno and Castro were established in Huilliche territory in 1558 and 1567 respectively. The Spanish defeat by Mapuches in the battle of Curalaba in 1598 triggered a general uprising that led to the destruction of all Spanish cities in Huilliche territory except Castro.

17th century

The portion of Futahuillimapu south of Maipué River became largely depopulated following a period of pillaging by the Spanish and loyalist Huilliches that had relocated from Osorno to the forts of Carelmapu and Calbuco. After Valdivia was refounded in 1645, the Spanish struggled to establish a land route to the vicinities of Chiloé Archipelago across independent Huilliche territory.

There are reports in the 17th and 18th centuries of internal conflicts among the Huilliche. This may have stunted population growth.

18th century

In late 18th century Basque navigator José de Moraleda wrote that Huilliches of Osorno were more stocky, agile and of general better appearance than the people of Chiloé. Their ponchos were described by Moraled as less pleasing ("vistosos") than those of Chiloé.

In 1792 the Huilliches were ravaged by a Spanish army led by Tomás de Figueroa. A peace parliament and treaty was signed in 1793. In the treaty Huilliche property was recognized by the Spanish.

19th century
Sociedad Stuttgart, a society established in the 19th century to bring German settlers to Chile, purchased about 15 000 km2 under fraudulent conditions from Huilliches in the Precordillera east of Osorno. This purchase was later ratified by Chilean courts and serves to illustrate how Chilean authorities ignored their own legal order that guaranteed Huilliche property.

As result of the establishment of Chilean and European settlers, including Germans, around Bueno River, Osorno Huilliches living in the Central Valley migrated to the coastal region of Osorno. In the 1920s, The economy of Osorno shifted towards cattle farming, with land ownership concentrated among the German immigrants, and many Huilliches became peasants of haciendas.

See also
Colonial alerce logging and trade

Notes

References

Bibliography
 Alberto Trivero (1999); Trentrenfilú, Proyecto de Documentación Ñuke Mapu. 

 Otero, Luis (2006). La huella del fuego: Historia de los bosques nativos. Poblamiento y cambios en el paisaje del sur de Chile. Pehuén Editores. .

Huilliche
Indigenous peoples of the Southern Cone
Mapuche groups